"Show Your Face" is a single by British singer Sandie Shaw. It was released in 1971 and did not have the impact on the chart that many of her singles had the previous decade. Although the song had a religious theme, Shaw has stated that she is not a Christian and was not one at the time the song was recorded.

1971 singles
Sandie Shaw songs
Songs written by Herbie Flowers